Union High School (Modoc) is a small high school located in Union Township, Modoc, Indiana. However, the official name is Union Township High School. It is one of five high schools in Randolph County, Indiana. In 2004 Union High School was named an Indiana Four Star School by the Indiana Department of Education. The school is a member of the Indiana High School Athletic Association (IHSAA), which is the governing body for high school sports in the state of Indiana.

History
Union High School (Modoc) was formed in 1952 after the closing of three small high schools: Modoc High School, Losantville High School, and Huntsville High School. For the first five years, students attended the old Modoc High School. In 1957, the new building was finished, and all students were relocated to the new building. In 1968 an addition was completed allowing Blountsville School, which housed grades 1-8, to be closed and consolidated with Union.

Athletics
The Union Rockets are a member of the Mid-Eastern Conference.

There are currently several sports at Union High. The include boys and girls basketball, boys and girls cross county, boys and girls track and field, boys and girls golf, boys baseball, girls volleyball, girls softball, and cheerleading.

See also
 List of high schools in Indiana

References

External links
 Official site

Public high schools in Indiana
Educational institutions established in 1952
Schools in Randolph County, Indiana
1952 establishments in Indiana